Kamta Singh was an Indian politician. He was a Member of Parliament, representing Bihar in the Rajya Sabha the upper house of India's Parliament as a member of the Swatantra Party.

References

Rajya Sabha members from Bihar
Swatantra Party politicians
1916 births
Year of death missing